Onchocerca tubingensis is the name of a nematode. It was discovered in 1974 and published by O. Bain und H. Schulz-Key in Tropenmedizin und Parasitologie and named after Tübingen. Red deer (Cervus elaphus) are the host of this parasite. The adult worms of Onchocerca tubingensis are found in subcutaneous nodules on the caudal part of the back, while the microfilariae are distributed on the ventral part of the body with maximum densities in the region of the sternum and with lower densities on the inner sides of the hindlegs. The infection rates of 94 red deer investigated in southern Germany during 1907–1974 were 23%.

References 

Parasitic nematodes of mammals
Cervus
Spirurida
Tübingen
Nematodes described in 1973